Senator Field may refer to:

Henry F. Field (1843–1932), Vermont State Senate
Richard Stockton Field (1803–1870), U.S. Senator from New Jersey from 1862 to 1863
Robert C. Field (1804–1876), Wisconsin State Senate

See also
Senator Fields (disambiguation)